Tenuitholiascus is a fungal genus in the monotypic family Tenuitholiascaceae, itself in the order Strigulales. The genus contains a single species, Tenuitholiascus porinoides, a foliicolous (leaf-dwelling) lichen found in China.

Taxonomy
The genus, and family were circumscribed in 2020 by Shu-Hua Jiang, Robert Lücking  and Jiang Chun Wei. It is only known to occur at the type locality. The genus name, which refers to its characteristic thin-walled asci, is derived from Latin roots: tenuis- ("slender"), tholus ("dome"), and ascus ("tube" or "bag"). The species epithet porinoides alludes to its resemblance  to genus Porina.

Molecular phylogenetic analysis revealed that the fungus represented a previously unknown lineage in the Dothideomycetes, forming a clade with a sister group relationship to the Strigulaceae, a family mostly comprising foliicolous lichen-forming fungi.

Description
The lichen, which lives on the cuticle of the leaf (and is readily removed from its surface), is smooth and pale green, measuring 3–12 mm in diameter and about 30–50 μm thick. The  partner is from the  green algal genus Phycopeltis. Tenuitholiascus porinoides produces colourless, spores that have 3 septa and measure 25–30 by 6–8 μm. No lichen products were detected in collected specimens using thin-layer chromatography. The characteristic feature of the fungus is the thin walls of the apex of its ascus–an uncommon  in the Dothideomycetes.

References

Dothideomycetes
Dothideomycetes genera
Lichen species
Lichen genera
Taxa described in 2020
Taxa named by Robert Lücking